The MV Bali Sea was a ro-ro rail ferry, previously a heavy lift ship. It started its life recovering ships and moving oil platforms, undergoing several name changes in the process. It became a rail ferry in 2000, shipping trains across the Gulf of Mexico. In 2021, when new ferries were introduced, the Bali Sea was taken out of service and sent to Alang, India, for decommissioning and eventual scrapping.

History

The ship, a semi-submersible heavy-lift ship at the time, was christened sometime in 1981 with the name Dan Lifter and was sent into service with Frigg Shipping Ltd. in 1982. A year later, it recovered RFA Sir Tristram after the Falklands War. In 1985, it went to Wijsmuller Transport with the name Super Servant 5 to move oil rigs. It stayed in Wijsmuller for 10 years, before being passed over to Gulf South Shipping, who passed the recently renamed Bali Sea to CG Railway. It operated as a rail ferry between Coatzacoalcos in Mexico and Mobile, Alabama, on a  route, carrying a maximum of 115 rail cars. In 2019, the Bali Sea was showing its age. As a result, new ferries were ordered from China, both of which arrived in 2021. With the arrival of the first, MV Cherokee, The Bali Sea was renamed Bala, sailed to Nhava Sheva, and decommissioned.

References

Semi-submersibles
Heavy lift ships
1981 ships
Ships built by Mitsubishi Heavy Industries
Ro-ro ships
Ferries